Susane Colasanti (born 1 May 1973) is an American author of young-adult fiction and a former high-school science teacher. She has published 11 young-adult titles since 2006. She lives in New York City.

Biography

Education and teaching career 
Colasanti grew up in Peapack-Gladstone, New Jersey. She attended Bernards High School in Bernardsville, and then attended the University of Pennsylvania in Philadelphia, where she majored in Astrophysics/Earth and Space Science with a minor in Psychology. During her senior year, she posed for Playboy's "Women of the Ivy League" pictorial, which was published in the magazine's October 1995 issue. 

Colasanti moved to Manhattan in 1996, completed a master's degree from New York University in science education and physics teaching, and worked for 10 years as a high-school teacher of earth science, physics, and meteorology in Manhattan and the South Bronx.

Writing career
Her first novel, When It Happens, was published in 2006. In 2007, she left her teaching position to become a full-time writer. She has since written 10 other young adult novels, including the City Love series. She lives in New York City.

Books 
When It Happens, New York : Viking, 2006.  In 842 libraries according to WorldCat.  
translated into German as Falling in love : die Liebe kommt ganz unverhofft
Translated into Polish by Marcin Górecki as Gdy nadejdzie czas, 2011
Take Me There, New York : Viking, 2008.  In 688 libraries according to WorldCat.  
Translated into Spanish by Sara Cano Fernández as Llévame allí, 2011
Translated into German by Barbara Abedi as Take me there eine Geschichte zum Verlieben 
Translated into French by Madeleine Nasalik as La pluie, les garçons et autres choses mystérieuses 
Waiting For You, New York : Viking, 2009.  In 706 libraries according to WorldCat.
Translated into Turkish by Süleyman Karakan & Nihal Kuşhan as Ne zaman geleceksin, 2009
Translated into German by Barbara Abedi as Waiting for you Geschichte über die Liebe,  
Translated into Polish as Gdy nadejdzie czas
Translated into Brazilian Portuguese as Esperando por você
Something Like Fate, New York : Viking, 2010  In 754 libraries according to WorldCat.<ref>Reviews:  Kirkus,  School library Journal, Booklist</ref>
Translated into Spanish as El novio de mi mejor amiga / Something like fateTranslated into Brazilian Portuguese as Tipo destinoTranslated into Indonesian as When it happens = saat hal itu terjadiSo Much Closer, New York : Viking, 2011.  In 616 libraries according to WorldCat.Reviews: School Library Journal,, Booklist
Translated into Brazilian Portuguese as Bem mais pertoKeep Holding On New York : Viking, 2012.  In 736 libraries according to WorldCat.Reviews: Kirkus, Publishers WeeklyAll I Need.'' New York : Viking, 2013.  In 97 libraries according to WorldCat. (as of May 2013)

References

External links

Official website

1973 births
American women children's writers
American children's writers
American writers of young adult literature
Living people
Women writers of young adult literature
Writers from New Jersey
Bernards High School alumni
New York University alumni
People from Peapack-Gladstone, New Jersey
University of Pennsylvania alumni
21st-century American women